Anna Stefanie Nanna Fryland Clausen (1 April 1900 – 2 August 1981) was a Danish diver. She was a gold medalist at the 1920 Summer Olympics.

Biography 
Clausen was born on 1 April 1900, the second of four children, and she grew up with her family in Vesterbro, Denmark. In 1915, she joined the Women's Sports Association, and soon began competing in swimming and diving competitions.

At the 1920 Summer Olympics, Clausen won the gold medal in the 10 metre platform competition.

She died on 2 August 1981.

See also
 List of members of the International Swimming Hall of Fame

References

External links
profile

1900 births
1981 deaths
Danish female divers
Olympic divers of Denmark
Divers at the 1920 Summer Olympics
Olympic gold medalists for Denmark
Olympic medalists in diving
Medalists at the 1920 Summer Olympics
Divers from Copenhagen